Rickettsia massiliae is a tick-borne pathogenic spotted fever group Rickettsia species.

References

Further reading
de Mera, Isabel G. Fernández, et al. "Rickettsia massiliae in the Canary Islands." Emerging infectious diseases 15.11 (2009): 1869.

External links
LPSN

Rickettsiaceae
Bacteria described in 1993